Sarcochilus parviflorus, commonly known as the southern lawyer orchid or green tree orchid, is an epiphytic orchid endemic to eastern Australia. It has up to eight rigid leaves and up to twelve small bright green to yellowish green flowers with reddish markings on the labellum.

Description
The labellum has three lobes, the side lobes curving upwards near their tips and the middle lobe with a short tooth on its midline. Flowering occurs between June and January.

Taxonomy and naming
Sarcochilus parviflorus was first formally described in 1838 by John Lindley and the description was published in Edwards's Botanical Register. The specific epithet (parviflorus) is derived from the Latin words parvus meaning "little" and flos meaning "flower".

Distribution and habitat
The southern lawyer orchid grows on trees, rarely on rocks, in rainforest in coastal areas and nearby tablelands between Brisbane and Tathra.

References

Endemic orchids of Australia
Orchids of Queensland
Orchids of New South Wales
Plants described in 1838
parviflorus